Stirner may refer to:

 Max Stirner, pseudonym for Johann Caspar Schmidt (1806–1856), German philosopher and journalist
  (1882–1943), painter, illustrator and poet
 Karl Stirner (1923–2016), American-German sculptor

German-language surnames